Five Graves to Cairo is a 1943 war film directed by Billy Wilder and starring Franchot Tone and Anne Baxter. Set in World War II, it is one of a number of films based on Lajos Bíró's 1917 play Hotel Imperial: Színmű négy felvonásban, including the 1927 film Hotel Imperial. Erich von Stroheim portrays Field Marshal Erwin Rommel in a supporting performance.

Hans Dreier, Ernst Fegté and Bertram C. Granger were nominated for the Academy Award for Best Art Direction, John F. Seitz for Best Cinematography, and Doane Harrison for Best Film Editing.

Plot
Corporal John Bramble is the sole survivor of a British tank crew after Erwin Rommel and his Afrika Korps capture Tobruk in June 1942 and pursue the British into Egypt. He stumbles across the North African desert into the town of Sidi Halfaya, where he finds the Empress of Britain, a small, isolated hotel owned by Farid. The only other employee is the French chambermaid Mouche, as the cook fled with the British and the waiter Davos was killed the night before by German bombing.

Farid hides the now-unconscious Bramble when the swiftly advancing Germans take over the hotel to use as headquarters for Field Marshal Rommel and his staff. Bramble assumes the identity of Davos to save himself. When Rommel summons him to a private chat, Bramble is stunned to discover that Davos was a valued German spy, but manages to play along. He learns that he is to be sent to Cairo next.

Later, he steals a pistol from genial, music-loving Italian General Sebastiano, planning to serve the field marshal a bullet rather than coffee the next morning. Not wanting trouble, Mouche steals the pistol and waits on Rommel herself. When some captured British officers are brought to the hotel for a luncheon with Rommel, one of them (a past guest) realizes that Davos has been replaced. Bramble privately explains who he is and what he plans to do. The officer orders him to use his position of trust to gather military intelligence instead.

At the luncheon, Rommel teases his guests, allowing them to ask him twenty questions about his future plans. Bramble listens with interest. From the conversation and later remarks by Rommel, he eventually deduces that the field marshal, disguised as an archeologist before the war, had secretly prepared five hidden supply dumps, the "Five Graves to Cairo", for the conquest of Egypt. The final piece of the puzzle (their locations) falls into place when Bramble realizes that Rommel's cryptic references to points Y, P, and T refer to the precise locations of the letters of the word "Egypt" printed on his map.

Meanwhile, Bramble and Mouche clash. She despises the British, believing they abandoned the French, including her two brothers, at Dunkirk. He in turn becomes disgusted at how she plays up to the Germans. As it turns out, Mouche's motives are not mercenary; she pleads with Rommel to release her wounded soldier brother from a concentration camp. He is unmoved, but his aide, Lieutenant Schwegler, is more appreciative of her charms. He pretends to help her, showing her fake telegrams to and from Germany.

That night however, when everyone takes shelter in the cellar during an Allied air raid, Schwegler discovers the body of the real Davos (identified by his clubfoot), uncovered by the bombing. In the noise and confusion of the raid, Schwegler chases Bramble through the darkened hotel, before Bramble kills the German and hides the body in Mouche's part of the servants' room. When Mouche finds out, she threatens to unmask him. However, she has a change of heart. Schwegler's body is soon found, and Rommel accuses her of killing his aide when she discovered he was lying about trying to get her brother released. To protect Bramble, Mouche confirms this. Bramble leaves for Cairo, but arranges for Farid to present evidence the next day at Mouche's trial that "Davos" committed the crime.

Bramble's information allows the British to blow up the dumps and thus thwart Rommel's plans, culminating in the Second Battle of El Alamein. When Bramble returns to Sidi Halfaya in triumph with his unit, he learns the Germans executed Mouche, even though she was exonerated of Schwegler's murder, because she would not stop saying that the British would be back. Bramble takes the parasol he bought her in Cairo, something she always wanted, and places it to provide shade for her grave.

Cast

Franchot Tone as Corporal John Bramble / Davos
Anne Baxter as Mouche
Akim Tamiroff as Farid
Erich von Stroheim as Field Marshal Erwin Rommel
Peter van Eyck as Lieutenant Schwegler
Fortunio Bonanova as General Sebastiano

Production
Production lasted from January 4 to February 20, 1943.  It was filmed at Paramount Studios, Hollywood, California, with some exteriors of Sidi Halfaya (a fictionalized version of Sidi Barrani) shot on location at the Salton Sea and other exteriors filmed at Camp Young at the Army Desert Training Center, Indio, California, where, with the cooperation of the Army Ground Forces, a battle sequence was staged, and in Yuma, Arizona.

Wilder wanted Cary Grant to play the role of Bramble. Grant was repeatedly asked by Wilder to star in several of his films, but though the two were friends, Grant consistently refused.

A Hollywood Reporter news item reported that in November 1942, David O. Selznick had agreed to lend Ingrid Bergman for this film. However, Paramount instead borrowed Anne Baxter from Twentieth Century-Fox.

The Germans are played by German actors and thus speak with the right accent, except for von Stroheim, who had emigrated from Austria to the US at the age of 24 and whose accent occasionally slips. The British hero is played by an American actor who speaks with an American accent.

The German tanks in the film are American M2 light tanks, which were used for training, while the British forces have the American M3 Medium tank which they were using at the time.

Reception
Bosley Crowther of The New York Times gave the film a mixed review. He admired one performance, writing, "... von Stroheim has all other movie Huns backed completely off the screen" and " ... whenever he appears in this picture, ... , he gives you the creeps and the shivers. Boy, what a nasty Hun!" However, he was less than impressed with the rest, complaining, "As though this fanciful story weren't sufficiently hard to take, Charles Brackett and Billy Wilder, a couple of old-hand Paramount wags, have dressed it up with shenanigans which have the flavor of fun in a haunted house." "It has a little something for all tastes, provided you don't give a darn." The Variety magazine response was more generous, calling it "a dynamic, moving vehicle" and praising Wilder's handling of "the varied story elements, countless suspenseful moments and vivid portrayals in excellent fashion." Dave Kehr of the Chicago Reader agreed, characterizing the film as a "crisp spy thriller" and, as Wilder's second stint at directing, "Excellent apprentice work, with many Wilder themes seething beneath the surface."

In 2008, Quentin Tarantino listed Five Graves to Cairo as his 10th favorite film of all time.

Real-life connection
Brigadier Dudley Clarke, the commander of the British deception department based in Cairo, saw Five Graves to Cairo in January 1944 and was inspired to create Operation Copperhead. General Bernard Montgomery had recently been transferred from North Africa to England to take command of the ground forces intended for the Normandy invasion. Clarke located a look-alike, pre-war actor Lieutenant M. E. Clifton James, and had him study Montgomery's appearance and mannerisms. The actor then made public visits to several Mediterranean bases in the guise of Montgomery just a few days before D-Day in an attempt to convince German intelligence that an Allied attack on northern Europe was not imminent. Though the ruse did not appear to have any significant impact on German plans, the events of Operation Copperhead were in turn dramatized in a book and a movie, both titled I Was Monty's Double.

Home media
The film is available on VHS, DVD and Blu-ray.

References

External links
 
 
 
 
 
 
Five Graves to Cairo on Lux Radio Theater: December 13, 1943

1943 films
1943 romantic drama films
1940s war drama films
American black-and-white films
American romantic drama films
American war drama films
American films based on plays
Films directed by Billy Wilder
Films scored by Miklós Rózsa
Films set in 1942
Films set in hotels
Films with screenplays by Billy Wilder
Films with screenplays by Charles Brackett
Cultural depictions of Erwin Rommel
North African campaign films
Paramount Pictures films
World War II films made in wartime
World War II spy films
1940s English-language films